Meehl is a surname. Notable people with the surname include:

Brian Meehl, American puppeteer and writer
Cindy Meehl, American documentary filmmaker
Gerald Meehl, American climate scientist
Lew Meehl, American soccer player and coach
Paul E. Meehl, American psychologist
Sid Meehl, Australian rules footballer